Bivincula diaphana is a moth in the family Bombycidae. It was described by Frederic Moore in 1879. It is found in the eastern Himalayas.

The wingspan is 25–29 mm. The ground colour is white with light grey markings.

References

Bombycidae
Moths described in 1879